Jordan Paul Pearce (born October 10, 1986) is an American former professional ice hockey goaltender.

Playing career
Pearce began his hockey career with the U.S. National Team Developmental Program and the Lincoln Stars of the USHL. While playing with the Lincoln Stars in 2004–05, Pearce finished with a record of 22–10–4 with 3.07 goals against average and a .897 save percentage which helped the Stars achieve a second-place tie in the USHL's Western Division.

After graduating from South Anchorage High School, he attended the University of Notre Dame and played for their men's ice hockey team in the CCHA for the following four years. In 2007–08 he was named CCHA Goaltender of the Year, and in 2008–09 he was a finalist for the CCHA MVP as well as being named the CCHA scholar-athlete of the year.

On April 10, 2009 it was announced that Pearce had signed a two-year entry level contract with the Detroit Red Wings to begin with the 2009–10 season and that he had begun an amateur tryout with the Grand Rapids Griffins of the AHL, the minor league affiliate of the Detroit Red Wings.

On July 27, 2011, Pearce signed a two-year contract extension with the Detroit Red Wings of the NHL and split his final two seasons of play between the Grand Rapids Griffins of the AHL and the Toledo Walleye of the ECHL.

Awards and honors

Career statistics

References

External links

1986 births
Living people
American men's ice hockey goaltenders
Grand Rapids Griffins players
Ice hockey people from Anchorage, Alaska
Lincoln Stars players
Notre Dame Fighting Irish men's ice hockey players
Toledo Walleye players